Notodoris lanzarotensis is a species of sea slugs. It is a dorid nudibranch, a shell-less marine gastropod mollusc in the family Aegiridae.

Distribution 
This species was described from Lanzarote, Canary Islands.

References

Aegiridae
Gastropods described in 2015